Miraclathurella herminea is a species of sea snail, a marine gastropod mollusk in the family Pseudomelatomidae, the turrids.

Description
The length of the shell varies between 12 mm and 21 mm.

Distribution
This species occurs off West Florida, USA to Eastern Brazil

References

 Bartsch, Paul. "New mollusks of the family Turritidae (with eight plates)." (1934).

External links
 Rosenberg G., Moretzsohn F. & García E. F. (2009). Gastropoda (Mollusca) of the Gulf of Mexico, Pp. 579–699 in Felder, D.L. and D.K. Camp (eds.), Gulf of Mexico–Origins, Waters, and Biota. Biodiversity. Texas A&M Press, College Station, Texas
 
 Gastropods.com: Miraclathurella herminea

herminea
Gastropods described in 1934